Accroche-coeur (english: Hanging Heart) is a 1987 French romantic crime drama film directed by Chantal Picault.

Cast
 Patrick Bauchau ...  Léo
 Sandrine Dumas ...  Sara
 László Szabó
 Elisabeth Kaza
 Zazie Delem
 Catherine Guillot
 Catherine Herold
 Sean MacKeon
 Georges Lunghini
 David Martin
 Jean-Christophe Pastrain
 Alice Piguet
 Juliette Sané
 Corinne Tell
 Dolorès Torres

External links 
 

1987 films
1980s French-language films
1987 crime drama films
French crime drama films
Romantic crime films
1980s French films